Live is a 2018 South Korean television series starring Jung Yu-mi, Lee Kwang-soo, Bae Seong-woo and Bae Jong-ok. It aired on tvN from March 10 to May 6, 2018 every Saturday and Sunday at 21:00 (KST).

Synopsis
Live tells the story of police officers - from the lowest field cadets and patrol officers, to their superiors including corporals, captains, and more - as they form the 'Live' team at the Hongil patrol division. Each officer has their own story, and each works hard in their own places at one of the busiest, most stressful jobs in the world, in order to earn a living.

Cast

Main
 Jung Yu-mi as Han Jung-oh  
Park Han-sol as young Han Jung-oh
A female officer who copes with the everyday stresses of her personal and professional life. She tries to stay focused while her heart is torn between two colleagues.
 Lee Kwang-soo as Yeom Sang-soo
 Oh Han-kyul as young Yeom Sang-soo
An ordinary man who, after being discharged from the military, joins the police force in an effort to have a normal life in mainstream society. However, he becomes an icon of misfortune with every case that he handles and runs into conflict with a superior.
 Bae Seong-woo as Oh Yang-chon
A former Violent Crimes Unit Detective. He was promoted quickly to the rank of Captain after solving several violent crime cases, but he is demoted due to an unexpected incident and is thrown into difficulties at the patrol division.
 Bae Jong-ok as Ahn Jang-mi
Oh Yang-chon's wife, and another detective. She has past ties with Han Jung-oh, and goes through a rough patch with Yang-chon in their marriage.

Supporting
 Shin Dong-wook as Choi Myung-ho
 Lee Si-eon as Kang Nam-il
 Lee Joo-young as Song Hye-ri
A female officer who joined the same police academy with Sang-su and Jung-oh which also shares the same flat with Jung-oh and neighbors with Sang-su. Always wants to be like Sang-su and Jung-oh to receive major crimes to solve and gain fame but gets stuck with an old mentor which destroys her chances.
 Kim Gun-woo as Kim Han-pyo
 Sung Dong-il as Ki Han-sol
 Jang Hyun-sung as Eun Kyung-mo
 Lee Soon-jae as Oh Yang-chon's father
 Yeom Hye-ran as Sang-soo's mother
 Go Min-si as Oh Song-i - Oh Yang-chon's daughter
 Jeon Su-ji as Child's mother
 Choi Go as Boy from the Internet Cafe
 Lee Jin-kwon as Supporting

Guest roles 
 Jeon Yeo-been as Kim Young-ji, Jung-oh's friend (ep.1)
 Hong Kyung as Yoo Man Yong (ep.9-11)
 Son Woo-hyeon as Special appearance

Production
This is Noh Hee-kyung and Kim Kyu-tae's fifth collaboration; actor Lee Kwang-soo had previously worked with both Kim and Noh on It's Okay, That's Love and Noh on Dear My Friends.

The first script reading was held on November 16, 2017.

International broadcast
 Southeast Asia - tvN Asia starting July 14 to September 9, 2020  every Tuesday and Wednesday at 9:35 pm (UTC +8).

Original soundtrack

Part 1

Part 2

Part 3

Part 4

Viewership

Awards and nominations

References

External links
  

 

TVN (South Korean TV channel) television dramas
2018 South Korean television series debuts
2018 South Korean television series endings
South Korean crime television series
Television shows written by Noh Hee-kyung
Television series by Studio Dragon
Korean-language Netflix exclusive international distribution programming